The Meat Puppets are an American rock band formed in January 1980 in Tempe, Arizona.

Albums

Studio albums

Live albums

Compilation albums

EPs

Singles

Soundtrack and compilation appearances
1981 – Light Bulb ("Meat Puppets")
1981 – Keats Rides a Harley ("H-Elenore" and "The Losing End")
1981 – Amuck ("Unpleasant")
1983 – The Blasting Concept ("Tumblin' Tumbleweeds" and "Meat Puppets")
1983 – Bethel ("Soup")
1984 – Basic Sampler ("Aroura Borealis" and "Problem Child")
1983 – Leather Chaps and Lace Petticoats ("Magic Toy Missing")
1986 – Lovedolls Superstar ("No Values")
1986 – The 7 Inch Wonders of the World (In a Car EP)
1986 – The Blasting Concept Vol. 2 ("I Just Want to Make Love to You")
1990 – Duck and Cover ("Good Golly Miss Molly")
1990 – The Edge of Rock ("Light")
1991 – Stereophonic ("That’s How It Goes")
1991 – Aural Fixations ("Funnel of Love")
1994 – Chasers ("Sam")
1994 – Fast Track to Nowhere ("House of Blue Light")
1994 – Cream of Cuts ("Backwater")
1994 – Love and a .45 ("Animal")
1995 – White Man's Burden ("Animal")
1995 – Alterno-Daze 90's Natural Selection ("Sam")
1995 – X Factor ("This Day")
1995 – Songs in the Key of X ("Unexplained")
1995 – Our Band Could Be Your Life: A Tribute to D Boon and the Minutemen ("The Price of Paradise")
1995 – UMPF ("Backwater")
1996 – A Small Circle of Friends ("Not All Right")
1996 – Barb Wire ("Scum" (Vapourspace remix))
1996 – Big Ones of Alternative Rock vol. 1 ("Backwater")
1997 – Alternative Rock Cafe ("Backwater")
1999 – Alt.Country Exposed Roots ("Lost")
1999 – Southern Edge Vol. 1 ("Sam")
2000 – Crime + Punishment in Suburbia ("Two Rivers")
2004 – Left of the Dial: Dispatches from the '80s Underground ("Lake of Fire")
2011 – Newermind: A Tribute to Nirvana ("Smells Like Teen Spirit")

Music videos

Video albums
 Alive in the Nineties (2003)
 A History Lesson Part 1 (2010)

References

Discography
Discographies of American artists
Rock music group discographies